Rajkot is a town in Sahiwal District, Punjab province, Pakistan. It is located 227 miles (365 kilometers) south of Islamabad, the country's capital.

References 

Populated places in Sahiwal District